Wallingfen railway station was a station on the Hull and Barnsley Railway, and served the village of Newport in the East Riding of Yorkshire, England.

The station opened on 27 July 1885 as Newport for goods traffic and a week later it opened to passengers. It was renamed Newport (Yorks) in September 1921 and on 1 July 1923 to Wallingfen to avoid confusion with others stations titled Newport. It closed to passengers on 1 August 1955 and closed completely on 6 April 1959. The station has been demolished, and a section of the M62 motorway was built over the railway alignment in the 1970s.

References

External links
 Wallingfen station on navigable 1947 O. S. map

Disused railway stations in the East Riding of Yorkshire
Railway stations in Great Britain opened in 1885
Railway stations in Great Britain closed in 1959
Former Hull and Barnsley Railway stations